The 2017 Northwestern Wildcats football team represented Northwestern University during the 2017 NCAA Division I FBS football season. The Wildcats played their home games at Ryan Field in Evanston, Illinois, and competed in the West Division of the Big Ten Conference. They were led by 12th-year head coach Pat Fitzgerald. This was the Wildcats' fifth ten-win season, three of which were led by Pat Fitzgerald. They finished the season 10–3, 7–2 in Big Ten play to finish in second place in the West Division. They were invited to the Music City Bowl where they defeated Kentucky.

Recruiting

Position key

Recruits

The Wildcats signed a total of 19 recruits.

Schedule
Northwestern announced its 2017 football schedule on July 11, 2013. The 2017 schedule consisted of 7 home and 5 away games in the regular season. The Wildcats hosted Big Ten foes Iowa, Michigan State, Minnesota, Penn State, and Purdue, and traveled to Illinois, Maryland, Nebraska,  Wisconsin.

The Wildcats hosted two of the three non-conference opponents, Bowling Green from the Mid-American Conference and Nevada from the Mountain West Conference, and traveled to Duke from the Atlantic Coast Conference.

Schedule Source:

Rankings

Roster

Players in the 2018 NFL Draft

References

Northwestern
Northwestern Wildcats football seasons
Music City Bowl champion seasons
Northwestern Wildcats football